A Sea So Far (2001) is a historical young-adult novel by Jean Thesman. Its sequel is Rising Tide (2003).

Plot
After the devastating San Francisco earthquake of 1906, two girls' lives become connected. Kate Keely is the orphaned daughter of a newspaper reporter father and an Irish immigrant mother, living close to poverty with an aunt until their home was destroyed by the earthquake. They move to a boardinghouse the aunt purchases with a friend, and there Kate learns of an opportunity to go to work as the companion to Jolie Logan. Jolie's father is a wealthy physician and her mother died in the earthquake. Suffering from a history of scarlet fever and the loss of her mother, Jolie is sickly and depressed and her father thinks a companion would lift her spirits and that together they could travel. Kate sees this position as an easy source of income and, more importantly, a chance to visit her mother's fabled Ireland. Together the girls do travel across country and then to Ireland, and become more than friends, and learn more of life than they expected.

Footnotes

American historical novels
2001 American novels
American young adult novels
Novels set in San Francisco
Novels set in the 1910s
Viking Press books